Algansea amecae, the Ameca chub, is a species of freshwater fish in the family Cyprinidae. It is endemic to the upper Ameca River basin in Jalisco, western Mexico.

References

Algansea
Fish described in 2009
Freshwater fish of Mexico
Endemic fish of Mexico